William Howells may refer to:

William Howells (Mormon) (1816–1851), Welsh Mormon missionary

William Dean Howells (1837–1920), author and critic
William W. Howells (1908–2005), anthropologist
William Howels or Howells, (1778–1832), Welsh priest of the Church of England

See also
William Howell (disambiguation), a similar name